Fogo Island Radar Station (Quad) was a United States Army General Surveillance Ground Radar Early Warning Station in the Dominion of Newfoundland. It was built during World War II and responsible for monitoring air traffic from Gander to Goose Bay and into the Atlantic Ocean. It was closed in 1945.

History
The site was established in 1942 as the first United States Ground Radar Early Warning Station, funded by the United States Army, which stationed the 685th Air Warning Squadron on the site under operational control of Newfoundland Base Command at Pepperrell Air Force Base. The station was assigned to Royal Canadian Air Force in November 1944, and was given designation "No 44 RU". The RCAF operated the station until 1 October 1945.

It operated an SCR-270 manned Early-warning radar.

United States Army Air Forces units and assignments 
Units:
 685th Air Warning Company, 1943
 Inactivated November 1944

Assignments:
 Newfoundland Base Command, Winter 1943

References

 Cornett, Lloyd H. and Johnson, Mildred W., A Handbook of Aerospace Defense Organization 1946 – 1980,  Office of History, Aerospace Defense Center, Peterson AFB, CO (1980)

Radar stations of the United States Air Force
Installations of the United States Air Force in Canada
Military installations closed in 1945
Military installations in Newfoundland and Labrador
Military installations established in 1943
1943 establishments in Newfoundland and Labrador
1945 disestablishments in Newfoundland and Labrador